2019–20 Brøndby IF season was Brøndby IF's 39th consecutive season in top-division of the Danish football league, the 30th consecutive in Danish Superliga, and the 54th as a football club. Besides the Superliga, the club competed in the 2019–20 Danish Cup and 2019–20 UEFA Europa League. It is the first season with head coach Niels Frederiksen, after replaced he caretaker manager Martin Retov.

Club

First team staff

Club administration

Staff changes 
1 July 2019 Brøndby announced that they had hired Niels Frederiksen as their new head coach, on a two-year contract. He joined the team after the 2019 UEFA European Under-21 Championship that same summer. Besides this Matthias Jaissle left the club, while caretaker Martin Retov, assumed his former position as assistant, along with new signing Jesper Sørensen. Besides this, Matthias Borst, Claus Fallentin, Lars Høgh and Ahron Thode all remained with the club.

The day before the first competitive game of the season, Brøndby IF announced that they had replaced CEO Jesper Jørgensen with the commercial director Ole Palmå. At the same time, it was announced that Ebbe Sand resigned from his job as sporting director after only six months in the job, as Carsten V. Jensen was hired as Executive Football Director, and Sand did not want another role in the staff of the club.

Goal of the season 
In March 2019, the club updatede their "Strategi 6.4", which among other things meant the club changed the sporting goals, so as the club in this and next season should qualify for the championship playoff in the Superligaen, as to secure European qualification from 2021-22.

Ebbe Sand announced before the end of the previous season, that it was an objective of the club to slim the squad, and make it younger, i order for the clubs talents to make their breakthrough as senior players easier.

Stadium and attendance 
On July 13, 2019 Brøndby IF announced that they had secured the Danish authorities permit to place a video surveillance system at Brøndby Stadium The technology should be used to recognize fans who had quarantine from the stadium, and was used the first time for the first home game of the season, against Silkeborg IF.

After the record for most season passes the previous season, the record for renewals were broken this season. 8,157 renewed their season pass, which equalled an increase of 27% compared to the year before.

Season 
The season officially started with a VO2max-test on June 19, and the first training session was on June 20, 2019. After this they played som friendlies, before the first competitive game on July 11, against FC Inter Turku from Finland.

Players

First team

Transfers

In

Out

Brøndby Player of the Month
Brøndby Player of the Month is an monthly award, in which the fans decides who has been the best player in the last month. The fans can vote on three players picked by the club. The voting begins after the last game each month, and is done through Facebook

Pre-season

Competitions

Overview

Superliga

Overview

Regular season

Championship round 
Points and goals will carry over in full from the regular season.

Matches 
Brøndby IF's matches in the regular season of 2019–20.

Danish Cup

Matches

UEFA Europa League

First-qualifying round

Second-qualifying round

Third-qualifying round

References 

Brøndby IF seasons
Danish football clubs 2019–20 season